The Spencer family is an aristocratic family in the United Kingdom. From the 16th century, its members have held numerous titles including the dukedom of Marlborough, the earldoms of Sunderland and Spencer, and the Churchill barony. Two prominent members of the family during the 20th century were Sir Winston Churchill and Diana, Princess of Wales.

History

Descent and claims

The House was founded in the 15th century by Henry Spencer (died c. 1478), from whom all members descend. In the 16th century the claim arose that the Spencers were a cadet branch of the ancient House Le Despencer, though this theory has since been debunked, in particular by J. Horace Round in his essay The Rise of the Spencers. The Spencers were first granted a coat of arms in 1504, "Azure a fess Ermine between 6 sea-mews’ heads erased Argent,"  but this bears no resemblance to the arms used by the family after c. 1595, which were derived from the Despencer arms, "Quarterly Argent and Gules in the second and third quarters a Fret Or overall on a Bend Sable three Escallops of the first" (the scallops standing for the difference as a cadet branch). Round argued that the Despencer descent was fabricated by Richard Lee, a corrupt Clarencieux King of Arms. Citing Round, The Complete Peerage dismissed the alleged Despencer descent as an "elaborate imposture" which "is now incapable of deceiving the most credulous."

Rise to wealth
A close relative of Henry Spencer (died c. 1478) was John Spencer, who in 1469 had become feoffee (trustee) of Wormleighton in Warwickshire and a tenant at Althorp in Northamptonshire in 1486. His nephew, Sir John Spencer (died 1522), first made a living by trading in livestock and other commodities and eventually saved enough money to purchase both the Wormleighton and Althorp lands. Wormleighton was bought in 1506, the manor house was completed in 1512. In 1508, Spencer also purchased the estate of Althorp with its moated house and several hundred acres of farmland. He had grazed sheep here from the 1480s. Impressed by the quality of the land, he eventually bought it and rebuilt the house in 1508. At that time, his estate and mansion in Warwickshire were considerably larger, and the house in Wormleighton was four times the size of Althorp. In 1511 he made further purchases to acquire the villages of Little Brington and Great Brington as well their parish church of St Mary the Virgin, from Thomas Grey, 2nd Marquess of Dorset. By putting down roots at Althorp, Spencer provided what was to become a home for the next 19 generations. In 1519 he was knighted by King Henry VIII, died three years later and was buried in the new family chapel at Great Brington.

The Spencers rose to opulent prominence during the 16th century. Sir John Spencer's grandson Sir John Spencer (d. 1586) was a Knight of the Shire for Northamptonshire. The Spencers’ administration of their Northamptonshire and Warwickshire estates was admired and often emulated by gentlemen all over England. Sheep from their pastures were purchased for breeding and it is probable that the family's success as farmers was rarely equalled in the century.

In the late 16th century, the latter Sir John Spencer's grandson Sir Robert Spencer (1570–1627) represented Brackley in Parliament. In 1601, he was made a Knight of the Garter, and created Baron Spencer, of Wormleighton, in the Peerage of England in 1603. During the reign of King James I he was reputed to be the richest man in England. The humble origins of the Spencers as sheep farmers once caused a heated exchange of words between wealthy yet then upstart Spencers with the more established Howards whose FitzAlan ancestors had been the Earls of Arundel since the 13th century. During a debate in the House of Peers, Lord Spencer was speaking about something that their great ancestors had done when suddenly the Earl of Arundel cut him off and said "My Lord, when these things you speak of were doing, your ancestors were keeping sheep". Lord Spencer then instantly replied, "When my ancestors as you say were keeping sheep, your ancestors were plotting treason."

Robert Spencer, 1st Baron Spencer, was succeeded in his peerage and estates by his eldest surviving son, William. He had previously represented Northamptonshire in Parliament. Two of his sons received additional peerages: His eldest son, Henry (1620–1643),  succeeded as 3rd Baron Spencer in 1636 and was created Earl of Sunderland in the Peerage of England in 1643. The younger son, Robert (1629–1694),  sat in the House of Commons from 1660 to 1679 and was created Viscount Teviot in the Peerage of Scotland in 1685.

The senior branch of the Spencers (later known as the Spencer-Churchill family) is currently represented by Jamie Spencer-Churchill, 12th Duke of Marlborough, direct descendant via the eldest male-line of Sir John Spencer, who was knighted by King Henry VIII in 1519 while the cadet branch of the family, the Spencers of Althorp who descends via the male-line from the younger son of the 3rd Earl Sunderland is represented by Charles Spencer, 9th Earl Spencer.

Spencer, later Spencer-Churchill
Robert Spencer, 2nd Earl of Sunderland, was Lord President of the Council from 1685 to 1688 and a Knight of the Garter. His son Charles, 3rd Earl of Sunderland, was Lord-Lieutenant of Ireland, Lord Privy Seal, Secretary of State for both the Northern and Southern Departments, Lord President of the Council, First Lord of the Treasury and a Knight of the Garter. His second wife was Lady Anne Churchill, the second daughter of the distinguished soldier John Churchill, 1st Duke of Marlborough. After Churchill's death in 1722, the Marlborough titles first passed to his eldest daughter Henrietta (1681–1733), then to Anne's second son, Charles. After the death of his elder brother, Robert, in 1729, Charles Spencer had already inherited the titles of 4th Earl of Sunderland and Baron Spencer of Wormleighton as well as the Spencer family estates. In 1733, he succeeded to the Churchill family estates and titles and became the 3rd Duke of Marlborough as well as a Knight of the Garter, while the Spencer estates in Bedfordshire, Northamptonshire (including Althorp) and Warwickshire passed to his younger brother John (1708–1746).

In 1815, Francis Spencer, the younger son of George Spencer, 4th Duke of Marlborough, was created Baron Churchill, of Wychwood in the County of Oxford, in the Peerage of the United Kingdom. In 1902, his grandson, the 3rd Baron, was created Viscount Churchill, of Rolleston in the County of Leicester, also in the Peerage of the United Kingdom.

In 1817, George Spencer, 5th Duke of Marlborough, obtained permission to assume and bear the additional surname of Churchill in addition to his own surname of Spencer, in order to perpetuate the name of his illustrious great-great-grandfather. At the same time he received Royal Licence to quarter his paternal arms of Spencer with the coat of arms of Churchill. The modern Dukes of Marlborough thus originally bore the surname "Spencer". The double-barrelled surname of "Spencer-Churchill" as used since 1817 has remained in the family to this day, though some members have preferred to style themselves merely "Churchill". The 7th Duke of Marlborough was the paternal grandfather of Sir Winston Churchill (1874–1965), the British prime minister. The latter's widow, Clementine (1885–1977), was created a life peeress in her own right as Baroness Spencer-Churchill in 1965.

The family seat of the Dukes of Marlborough is Blenheim Palace in Woodstock, Oxfordshire. Most Spencer-Churchills are interred in the churchyard of St Martin's Church, Bladon, a short distance from the palace; only the Dukes and Duchesses are buried in the Blenheim Palace chapel.

Spencer, of Althorp House 

In 1761, John Spencer (1734–1783), a grandson of the 3rd Earl of Sunderland, was created Baron Spencer of Althorp and Viscount Spencer in the Peerage of Great Britain by King George III. In 1765, he was further created Viscount Althorp and Earl Spencer, also in the Peerage of Great Britain. In 1755, he had privately married Margaret Poyntz (1737–1814) in his mother's dressing room at Althorp. They had five children, including the 2nd Earl Spencer, who later became Home Secretary from 1806 to 1807 and a Knight of the Garter. His older son, the 3rd Earl Spencer was Chancellor of the Exchequer under Lord Grey and Lord Melbourne from 1830 to 1834. The 2nd Earl's youngest son George (1799–1864) converted from Anglicanism to the Roman Catholic Church, became a priest and took the name of Father Ignatius of St Paul. He worked as a missionary and is a candidate for beatification. His older brother, who eventually became the 4th Earl Spencer, was a naval commander, courtier and Whig politician. He initially served in the Royal Navy and fought in the Napoleonic Wars and the Greek War of Independence, eventually rising to the rank of Vice-Admiral, and was made a Knight of the Garter in 1849. His son, the 5th Earl Spencer, who was known as the "Red Earl" because of his distinctive long red beard, was a close friend of prime minister William Ewart Gladstone. He served twice as Lord Lieutenant of Ireland and was made a Knight of the Garter in 1864. He was succeeded in 1910 by his half-brother, the 6th Earl Spencer, who had been made Viscount Althorp, of Great Brington in the County of Northamptonshire, in the Peerage of the United Kingdom, in 1905 and served as Lord Chamberlain from 1905 to 1912. He became a Knight of the Garter in 1913, and was succeeded in the earldom and estates by his son, the 7th Earl Spencer, in 1922. His son, the 8th Earl Spencer, succeeded to the earldom and estates in 1975. He married Frances Ruth Roche in 1954 and had a daughter, Diana, who married Prince Charles in 1981.

The family seat of the Earl Spencer is Althorp in Northamptonshire, their traditional burial place is the parish church of St Mary the Virgin Church, Great Brington. The family estate includes significant land holdings in other parts of the country, including the village of North Creake in Norfolk.

Members of the family

Spencer Knights
 Sir John Spencer, Kt. of Snitterfield & Wormleighton (1447–1522) married Isabel, daughter of Sir Walter Graunt, of Snitterfield
 Sir William Spencer, Kt. of Wormleighton & Althorp (1483–1532) married Susan, daughter of Sir Richard Knightley, of Fawsley, Northants
 Sir John Spencer, Kt. of Wormleighton & Althorp (1524–1586) married Katherine, daughter of Sir Thomas Kitson, of Hengrove, Suffolk
 Sir John Spencer, Kt. (1546–1600) married Mary, daughter of Sir Robert Catlyn, of Berne, Dorset
 Sir Robert Spencer (1570–1627), was made 1st Baron Spencer

Spencer Baronets

This now extinct line descended from two younger sons of Sir John Spencer (1524–1586) and his wife Katherine Kitson: 
 Their third son William was a landowner in Yarnton, Oxfordshire; his son Thomas was created Baronet of Yarnton in 1611. 
 Their fourth son Richard was the ambassador of James I to the Dutch Republic; his son, John, was a landowner in Great Offley, Hertfordshire and was created Baronet of Offley in 1627.

Barons Spencer
 Robert Spencer, 1st Baron Spencer (1570–1627), married Margaret, daughter of Sir Francis Willoughby (1547-1596), Kt.
 William Spencer, 2nd Baron Spencer (1591–1636), married Penelope, daughter of Henry Wriothesley, 3rd Earl of Southampton
 Henry Spencer, 3rd Baron Spencer (1620–1643), royalist in the English Civil War, was made 1st Earl of Sunderland

Earls of Sunderland

 Henry Spencer, 1st Earl of Sunderland (1620–1643), royalist in the English Civil War
 Robert Spencer, 2nd Earl of Sunderland (1640–1702), politician
 Charles Spencer, 3rd Earl of Sunderland (1675–1722), politician
Robert Spencer, 4th Earl of Sunderland (1701–1729)
 Charles Spencer, 5th Earl of Sunderland (1706–1758), succeeded his maternal aunt as 3rd Duke of Marlborough

Dukes of Marlborough

 Charles Spencer, 5th Earl of Sunderland, 3rd Duke of Marlborough (1706–1758), general and politician
 George Spencer, 4th Duke of Marlborough (1739–1817), politician
 George Spencer-Churchill, 5th Duke of Marlborough (1766–1840), elder son of the 4th Duke, changed his surname from "Spencer" to "Spencer-Churchill"
 George Spencer-Churchill, 6th Duke of Marlborough (1793–1857), eldest son of the 5th Duke
 John Winston Spencer-Churchill, 7th Duke of Marlborough (1822–1883), eldest son of the 6th Duke (and paternal grandfather of Sir Winston Churchill)
 George Charles Spencer-Churchill, 8th Duke of Marlborough (1844–1892), eldest son of the 7th Duke
 Charles Richard John Spencer-Churchill, 9th Duke of Marlborough (1871–1934), only son of the 8th Duke
 John Albert William Spencer-Churchill, 10th Duke of Marlborough (1897–1972), elder son of the 9th Duke
 John George Vanderbilt Henry Spencer-Churchill, 11th Duke of Marlborough (1926-2014), elder son of the 10th Duke
 Charles James Spencer-Churchill, 12th Duke of Marlborough (born 1955), eldest son of the 11th Duke

Barons and Viscounts Churchill

This line of the family descends from Francis Spencer, younger son of the 4th Duke of Marlborough. In 1902, his grandson, the 3rd Baron, was created Viscount Churchill. Holders of these titles include
Francis Almeric Spencer, 1st Baron Churchill (1779–1845)
Victor Albert Francis Charles Spencer, 1st Viscount Churchill (1864–1934)

Earls Spencer

 John Spencer, 1st Earl Spencer (1734–1783), a grandson of the 3rd Earl of Sunderland through his third and youngest son
 George John Spencer, 2nd Earl Spencer (1758–1834), politician and book collector
 John Charles Spencer, 3rd Earl Spencer (1782–1845), better known as Lord Althorp, politician
 Frederick Spencer, 4th Earl Spencer (1798–1857)
 John Poyntz Spencer, 5th Earl Spencer (1835–1910), politician
 Charles Robert Spencer, 6th Earl Spencer (1857–1922)
 Albert Edward John Spencer, 7th Earl Spencer (1892–1975)
 (Edward) John Spencer, 8th Earl Spencer (1924–1992), father of Diana, Princess of Wales
 Charles Edward Maurice Spencer, 9th Earl Spencer (born 1964), younger brother of Diana, Princess of Wales

Notable marriages
 Jane Spencer, daughter of Sir John Spencer of Hodnell, married Sir William Cope
 Jane Spencer, daughter of Sir William Spencer (1483–1558) of Wormleighton and Althorp, married Sir Richard Brydges, Kt.
 Alice Spencer (1559–1637), daughter of Sir John Spencer (1524–1586), married Ferdinando Stanley, 5th Earl of Derby. Their daughter Anne (1580–1647) was heiress presumptive to the English throne upon the death of Elizabeth I according to the will of Henry VIII and the Third Succession Act. As Lady Derby, Alice was a noted patron of the arts and to whom poet Edmund Spenser represented the character "Amaryllis" in his eclogue Colin Clouts Come Home Againe in 1595 and dedicated his poem The Teares of the Muses in 1591. 
 Lady Georgiana Spencer (1757–1806), daughter of the 1st Earl Spencer, married William Cavendish, 5th Duke of Devonshire
 Diana Russell, Duchess of Bedford (born Lady Diana Spencer), daughter of the 3rd Earl of Sunderland, married in 1731 John Russell, 4th Duke of Bedford
 Diana, Princess of Wales (born The Hon. Diana Spencer), daughter of the 8th Earl Spencer, married in 1981 Charles, Prince of Wales (later King Charles III), and had issue. They separated in 1992 and divorced in 1996.
 Clarissa Spencer-Churchill, daughter of Jack Spencer-Churchill (younger brother of Sir Winston Churchill), married Sir Anthony Eden, Prime Minister of the United Kingdom.
 Sir Winston Churchill (1874–1965), Prime Minister of the United Kingdom, grandson of the 7th Duke of Marlborough, married Clementine Hozier (1885–1977), later a life peeress in her own right as Baroness Spencer-Churchill.
 The 9th Duke of Marlborough married Consuelo Vanderbilt, member of the prominent American Vanderbilt family.
 The 11th Duke of Marlborough married in 1961 Athina Livanos, former wife of Aristotle Onassis. In 1972 he married Countess Rosita Douglas-Stjernorp, daughter of Swedish nobleman and diplomat Count Carl Douglas-Stjernorp. They were divorced in 2008. Her elder sister Elisabeth (b. 1940) is married to Prince Max, Duke in Bavaria, heir presumptive to the Headship of the Royal House of Bavaria. As an artist, she is known professionally as Rosita Marlborough.
 Mary Spencer-Churchill, daughter of Sir Winston Churchill, married Christopher Soames, Baron Soames, and was made a Lady of the Garter in 2005.
 The 7th Earl Spencer, when heir to the earldom and styled Viscount Althorp,  married in 1919 Lady Cynthia Hamilton, daughter of the 3rd Duke of Abercorn.
 The 8th Earl Spencer, when heir to the earldom and styled Viscount Althorp, married in 1954 the Hon. Frances Ruth Roche, daughter of the 4th Baron Fermoy.
The 9th Earl Spencer, then Viscount Althorp, married Victoria Lockwood, a British fashion model, in 1989. They divorced in 1997. He married his third wife Karen Gordon, a Canadian philanthropist, in 2011.

Other notable members
 Lady Diana Beauclerk (née Spencer) (1734–1808), eldest child of the 3rd Duke of Marlborough, was artist and Lady of the Bedchamber to Queen Charlotte from 1762 to 1768.
 Lord Charles Spencer (1740–1820), second son of the 3rd Duke of Marlborough, was Postmaster General of the United Kingdom from 1801 to 1806 and Master of the Mint in 1806.
 William Robert Spencer (1769–1834), younger son of Lord Charles Spencer, became a poet and wit.
 Aubrey George Spencer (1795–1872), son of the poet William Robert Spencer, became the first Bishop of Newfoundland in 1839, later Bishop of Jamaica. 
 George John Trevor Spencer (1799–1866), son of the poet William Robert Spencer, became Bishop of Madras in 1837. 
 George Spencer (1799–1864), son of the 2nd Earl Spencer. He was first an Anglican priest, converted to Catholicism to become a Roman Catholic priest as Father Ignatius, worked as a missionary and is now a candidate for beatification.
 General Sir Augustus Almeric Spencer, GCB (1807–1893), third son of Francis Almeric Spencer, 1st Baron Churchill (1779–1845).
 Lord Randolph Henry Spencer-Churchill, publicly known as Lord Randolph Churchill (1849–1895), son of the 7th Duke of Marlborough, Chancellor of the Exchequer and Leader of the House of Commons, father of Sir Winston Leonard Spencer Churchill.
 The Reverend Canon Henry Spencer Stephenson, M.A. (1871-1957), Chaplain to King George VI and Queen Elizabeth II.
 Randolph Frederick Edward Spencer-Churchill, publicly known as Randolph Churchill (1911–1968), son of Sir Winston Leonard Spencer Churchill.
 Lady Rosemary Spencer-Churchill (born 1929), maid of honour to Elizabeth II at her coronation in 1953.
 Lady Kitty Spencer (born 1990), daughter of Charles Spencer, 9th Earl Spencer
 Louis Spencer, Viscount Althorp (born 1994), son of Charles Spencer, 9th Earl Spencer

Members of the Order of the Garter 
Many members of the Spencer family have also been knights or dames of the Order of the Garter. The following is a list is of all Spencer members of this order, across all branches of the family, along with their year of investiture.

 1601 – Robert Spencer, 1st Baron Spencer
 1687 – Robert Spencer, 2nd Earl of Sunderland
 1719 – Charles Spencer, 3rd Earl of Sunderland 
 1741 – Charles Spencer, 3rd Duke of Marlborough
 1768 – George Spencer, 4th Duke of Marlborough
 1799 – George Spencer, 2nd Earl Spencer 
 1849 – Frederick Spencer, 4th Earl Spencer 
 1865 – John Spencer, 5th Earl Spencer
 1868 – John Spencer-Churchill, 7th Duke of Marlborough 
 1902 – Charles Spencer-Churchill, 9th Duke of Marlborough
 1913 – Charles Spencer, 6th Earl Spencer 
 1953 – Sir Winston Churchill
 2005 – Mary, Baroness Soames, née Spencer-Churchill

Coat of arms

Family tree

Spencer origins

Barons Spencer of Wormleighton and Earls of Sunderland

Dukes of Marlborough

Earls Spencer

For the Earls Spencer from John Spencer to present see: Family Tree of the Earls Spencer.

Barons and Viscounts Churchill

References

Bibliography
Round, J.H. (1901) Studies in Peerage and Family History, A. Constable and Company, London.

External links
 Spencer Family Tree, Althorp.com
 Origins of the Spencer family
 Family tree and information – Archived link
 http://homepages.rootsweb.com/~djmurphy/conn/washington.htm
 The Heraldry of the Early Spencers
 Heraldry of the House of Spencer

 
Noble families of the United Kingdom